The women's 800 metre freestyle competition of the swimming events at the 1973 World Aquatics Championships took place on 9 September.

Records
Prior to the competition, the existing world and championship records were as follows.

The following records were established during the competition:

Results
24 swimmers participated in 3 heats. The event was a timed final. The first two heats were contested in the morning with the third and final heat contested in the evening.

References

Freestyle 0800 metre, women's
World Aquatics Championships
1973 in women's swimming